Tualatin Valley Fire & Rescue (TVF&R) is a special-purpose government fire fighting and emergency services district in the Portland metropolitan area of Oregon. Established in 1989 with a merger between Washington County Fire District 1 and the Tualatin Rural Fire Protection District, it primarily provides fire and emergency medical services in eastern Washington County, but also provides services in neighboring Multnomah, Clackamas, and Yamhill counties. It serves unincorporated areas along with the cities of Beaverton, Tigard, Tualatin, West Linn, Wilsonville, and Sherwood, among others. With over 400 firefighters and 27 fire stations, the district is the second largest fire department in the state and has an annual budget of $197 million.

History
Beaverton incorporated in 1893, and by 1914 had a volunteer fire department. To the south, Tualatin incorporated in 1913 and on February 2, 1935, formed the Tualatin Fire Department. Residents of unincorporated West Slope contracted with Beaverton’s fire department to have the latter provide service starting in 1941, but created their own West Slope Rural Fire Protection District in 1949.

In 1946, the Tualatin department became the Tualatin Rural Fire Protection District and opened a new station on Boones Ferry Road, and in 1948 the Stafford-Wilsonville Fire Department merged into the new rural district. Also in 1946, the Cedar Mill Rural Fire Protection District was created, followed by the Beaverton Rural Fire Protection District in 1947 that covered the Aloha area. The Beaverton Rural district contracted with Beaverton for services, with the original station on 185th at Blanton across from the post office. A second station was opened in 1965 in the Progress area, with a third opening adjacent to Tektronix on Jenkins Road in 1967.

Sherwood merged their fire department with Tualatin Rural in 1968. Municipal fire departments in Tigard and King City, and Sherwood later joined the Tualatin Rural Fire Protection District. In 1972, Washington County Fire District 1 was created with the merger of the Beaverton Rural, Cedar Mill Rural, and the West Slope Rural fire districts.

Washington County Fire District 1 and the Tualatin Rural Fire Protection District began discussing a merger in 1985, and in November 1988 the two districts signed off on the plan with a preliminary name of as Consolidated Fire and Rescue District. The name Tualatin Valley Fire & Rescue was adopted by the new entity in January 1989, and the district was officially created in February 1989. The new district covered  with 176,040 residents and had 17 fire stations. WCFD1 covered  with about 122,040 people in eastern and northern Washington County including Beaverton, Metzger, Garden Home, Aloha, Reedville, Bonnie Slope, Oak Hills, West Slope, Raleigh Hills, Rockcreek, and part of Tigard. Tualatin Rural covered  with about 54,000 people in southern Washington County and western Clackamas County including Tualatin, Wilsonville, King City, Sherwood, Durham, Rivergrove, as the rest of Tigard. WCFD1 had eight fire stations with 126 firefighters, while Tualatin Rural had seven fire stations with 100 firefighters.

Prior to the merger, Washington County Fire District 1 signed an agreement with Hillsboro in 1987 in which TVF&R would not oppose annexations by the city that would remove properties from the district. The agreement also could have led to a merger with the Hillsboro Fire Department. The next year the district and Hillsboro agreed to have WCFD1 continue providing service in the recently annexed Tanasbourne neighborhood for five years.

In April 1989, the new district opened a training facility. Washington County Fire District 2 (WCFD2) started negotiations in October 1989 with TVF&R for a partial merger, though the merger never occurred. At that time TVF&R maintained WCFD2’s equipment, along with Hillsboro’s equipment. Multnomah County Fire Districts 4 and 20, plus the Valley View Water District, merged into TVF&R in 1995. Beaverton voters finally approved an official merger into the district in 1996.

West Linn contracted TVF&R for fire services in 1998, and then joined the district in 2004. Oregon City contracted with TVF&R from 1999 to 2003. In 1999, TVF&R was awarded the International Association of Fire Chiefs' Fire Service Award for Excellence for its Community Assistance Program. The district achieved national accreditation in August 2000 by the Commission on Fire Accreditation International. Rosemont Fire District in West Linn became part of the district in 2001. In 2006, its Apartment Program led to the International Association of Fire Chiefs' awarding the Fire Service Award for Excellence to TVF&R.

Apparatus and stations

Apparatus operated by the district includes 37 engines, 6 trucks, 11 water tenders, plus specialty equipment such as 5 HAZMAT trucks, 3 rescue boats, 13 EMS units, 4 technical rescue vehicles, and 4 elevated waterway units. In 2017, TVF&R responded to 1,362 fires and 33,390 medical emergencies, among the 49,211 total calls for service.

The district operates 28 fire stations across the area. This includes two in Wilsonville, two in West Linn, one each in Tualatin and Sherwood, two in Tigard, one in King City, five in Beaverton, one in the Stafford area, one on Cooper Mountain, one in Aloha-Reedville, one each in the Rock Creek and Bethany areas, two in the West Hills, one in North Plains, and two in Newberg. In October 2015 TVF&R added its first mini-station in Raleigh Hills. In addition to the fire stations, the district operates a training center between Tualatin and Wilsonville and three operations centers, of which the one in Tigard also serves as the main command center. In January 2019, TVF&R started construction of a new station, located in the Rivergrove area just north of Meridian Park Hospital. Station 39 was completed in January 2020.

Organization
TVF&R serves about 520,000 people in Washington, Clackamas, Multnomah, and Yamhill counties on Portland’s Westside, mostly in the Tualatin Valley. The district is the second largest fire department in Oregon after Portland's Fire Bureau, and is the largest fire district in Oregon. Cities in the district are Beaverton, Durham, King City, Newberg, North Plains, Rivergrove, Sherwood, Tigard, Tualatin, and West Linn. It also covers unincorporated areas such as Aloha, Cedar Mill, Bethany, Rockcreek, including most of eastern Washington County. Accredited by the Commission on Fire Accreditation International (CFAI), TVF&R has a five-member board of directors elected by residents that govern the district.  the district had 416 paid fire fighters and paramedics, 67 volunteers, 16 prevention and 7 training staff, and 108 administration and support personnel.

See also

References

External links

Fire departments in Oregon
Washington County, Oregon
Clackamas County, Oregon
Multnomah County, Oregon
1989 establishments in Oregon
Government agencies established in 1989
Fire protection districts in the United States